Bandia is a census town in Udham Singh Nagar district in the state of Uttarakhand, India.

Geography

Demographics
 India census, Bandia had a population of 8897. Males constitute 56% of the population and females 44%. Bandia has an average literacy rate of 55%, lower than the national average of 59.5%; with 64% of the males and 36% of females literate. 13% of the population is under 6 years of age.

References

Cities and towns in Udham Singh Nagar district